Wayne Srhoj (born 23 March 1982, in Mareeba) is an Australian footballer who plays for Mareeba Bulls FC in the Far North Queensland soccer zone.

Club career
Between summer of 2006 and February 2007, Srhoj and teammate Abiodun Agunbiade did not play a single official game, as they claimed their contract with FC Naţional had run out at the end of the 2005/2006 season. After seven months of controversial court hearings and delays, the final decision favoured the players who then signed with the Timișoara based team FC Timișoara.

FC Timișoara released Srhoj from his contract at the end of the 2007–08 Season. On 4 September 2008 Srhoj signed with Perth for the second time in his career.

On 13 April 2010 Melbourne Heart announced Srhoj would be joining the new franchise for 2010–11 season. He soon became an integral part of the new side, starting in 10 of their first 12 matches. He also picked up five yellow cards in this time, meaning he was suspended for one match.

Srhoj then returned to his home town in Mareeba, and played for the Mareeba United Football Club from 2013, played a key role in the Bulls winning the treble in 2014 and going undefeated in 2015.

International career
Srhoj has represented Australia at U-17, U-20 and U-23 levels. He started in all of Australia's games at both the 1999 U-17 World Cup in New Zealand and the 2001 U-20 World Cup in Argentina. Srhoj featured in many of the Olyroos' lead up games for 2004 Olympics, including the Oceania region Olympic qualifying series and a lead up tour of Switzerland in June, but did not make the final 18-man squad for Athens.

A-League career statistics
(Correct as of 8 March 2010)

Honours
With Australia:
 FIFA U-17 World Championship: 1999 (Runners-up)
With Sydney Olympic:
  NSL Championship: 2001–2002
With Perth Glory:
  NSL Championship: 2003–2004

References

External links
 Melbourne Heart profile
 Oz Football profile

1982 births
Living people
People from Queensland
Australian soccer players
Australian expatriate soccer players
Expatriate footballers in Romania
Australian expatriate sportspeople in Romania
A-League Men players
Liga I players
Brisbane Strikers FC players
FC Progresul București players
FC Politehnica Timișoara players
Perth Glory FC players
Melbourne City FC players
Sydney Olympic FC players
National Soccer League (Australia) players
Australian people of Croatian descent
Association football midfielders